The 1991 All-Ireland Senior Football Championship was the 105th staging of the All-Ireland Senior Football Championship, the Gaelic Athletic Association's premier inter-county Gaelic football tournament. The championship began on 19 May 1991 and ended on 15 September 1991.

In the Munster semi-final Kerry ended Cork's 2 years as All Ireland champions. 

Down defeated Meath in the final by a scoreline of 1–16 to 1–14. The Ulster county's victory was to be the start of four consecutive All-Ireland titles for the province. For Meath, it was their second consecutive defeat in a final, having lost to Cork in the 1990 final.

The Championship was noted for the tie between Dublin and Meath that took three replays to decide.

Results

Connacht Senior Football Championship

Quarter-finals

Semi-finals

Finals

Leinster Senior Football Championship

Note for the first time since 1975 there's a full, straightforward or proper open draw top county teams such as Dublin, Meath or Offaly no longer byes to the teams to the Quarter-finals.

Preliminary round
 

Quarter-finals

Semi-finals

Final

Munster Senior Football Championship
In 1991, for the first time in years, the Munster Championship got rid of its seeded draw system and moved to an open draw.  With the exception of Tipperary in 1935, Kerry or Cork had won every Munster title since 1923. The open draw was expected to weaken Kerry & Cork, and improve Clare, Limerick, Tipperary & Waterford. Since 1947, Cork vs Kerry was the most common Munster final until 1990, but less common from then on.

Quarter-finals

Semi-finals

Final

Ulster Senior Football Championship

Preliminary round

Quarter-finals

Semi-finals

Final

All-Ireland Senior Football Championship

Semi-finals

Final

Championship statistics

Scoring

Overall

Single game

Miscellaneous

 Seeding is abolished in the Leinster and Munster championships meaning an open draw in Leinster for the first time since 1974 or Munster for the first time in 40 years.
 Fermanagh's 3–12 to 1–8 defeat of Antrim in the Ulster quarter-final is their first victory in the championship since 1983.
 The 1991 championship became famous for the four-game saga between Meath and Dublin in the preliminary round of the Leinster Championship. The four games comprised three draws, with two still ending level even after extra time. Meath eventually triumphed by a single point. A combined total of just under 237,000 people attended the four games in what was a major windfall for the Leinster Council.
 While in the Quarter-final stage of the Leinster championship Meath played Wicklow twice and in the semi-final game between Laois and Louth also ended in a draw and went to replay making it the largest Leinster championship of Modern times.
 Limerick reached their first Munster final since 1965 but lost it to Kerry, since 1947 all Munster finals expect for Cork vs Clare 1949, Cork vs Waterford 1957, Kerry vs Waterford 1960 and Kerry vs Limerick in 1965 the rest were all Kerry vs Cork deciders.
 Meath and Laois meet in the Leinster final for the first time since 1951.
 Down win the All Ireland final for the first time in 23 years and were first Ulster county since 1968 to win and also first not from Munster/Leinster of course.

References

All-Ireland Senior Football Championship